Kita Cercle is an administrative subdivision of the Kayes Region of Mali.  The administrative centre (chef-lieu) is the town of  Kita. In the 2009 census the population of the cercle  was 434,379.

The cercle is divided into 33 communes:

Badia
Bendougouba
Benkadi Founia
Boudofo
Bougaribaya
Didenko or Dindanko
Djidian
Djougoun
Gadougou I
Gadougou II
Guémoucouraba 
Kassaro
Kita (an urban commune)
Kita Nord
Kita Ouest
Kobri
Kokofata
Kotouba
Koulou
Kourouninkoto (an urban commune)
Madina
Makano
Namala Guimba
Niantanso
Saboula
Sébékoro
Séféto Nord
Séféto Ouest
Senko
Sirakoro
Souransan-Tomoto
Tambaga
Toukoto

References

Cercles of Mali